Daniel "Sahaj" Ticotin (born April 5, 1969) is an American musician, vocalist, guitarist, record producer, and lead vocalist and rhythm guitarist of the alternative metal bands Raand Meytal.

Biography
Sahaj was born to a Puerto Rican mother and a Russian-Jewish father, the brother of motion picture and television actress, Rachel Ticotin. During a pilgrimage to India in 1992, he studied meditation and was given the name "Sahaj". He currently lives in Woodland Hills, California, where he produces and composes for various artists. Associated acts are Ra, Motley Crue, STΛRSΞT, Meytal, New Years Day, Stitched Up heart, Otherwise, Texas Hippie Coalition, September Mourning, Lajon Witherspoon, Diamante, Tommy Vext and many others...

Sahaj held the record for longest single note, for a male vocalist, in a song, having held a high B for 24 seconds. He was overtaken by Jan Werner Danielsen of Norway with 28 seconds in his live version of Nella Fantasia. This record breaker can be heard on Ra's live album, Raw, on the track "Skorn". Sahaj Ticotin overtook the previous record of 20.2 seconds which was held by Morten Harket, the lead singer of A-ha, in the song, "Summer Moved On".

He has produced Downstait under his own company, Sahaja Music Records.

, Sahaj was fronting the band Meytal with lead vocals, lead/rhythm guitar, bass, and backing vocals.

Discography

Ra albums

Solo albums

Meytal albums

See also 

List of Puerto Ricans

References

External links 
  Interview with Sahaj and his band Ra
   Interview with Sahaj and his band Ra
   Interview with Sahaj and his band Ra
  Sahaj's Myspace
  Ra's Myspace
  Downstait's Myspace

1974 births
Living people
People from Tarzana, Los Angeles
American people of Russian descent
American musicians of Puerto Rican descent
21st-century American male singers
21st-century American singers